William Joseph Lee (January 9, 1894 – January 6, 1984) was an American Major League Baseball outfielder who played for the St. Louis Browns in  and .

External links
Baseball Reference.com

1894 births
1984 deaths
St. Louis Browns players
Baseball players from New Jersey
Major League Baseball outfielders
Trenton Tigers players
Atlanta Crackers players
Nashville Vols players
Oakland Oaks (baseball) players
Omaha Rourkes players
Omaha Buffaloes players
Augusta Tygers players
Hartford Senators players
Columbia Comers players
Gastonia Comers players
Sportspeople from Bayonne, New Jersey
St. Croix Downeasters players